UCFB (University Campus of Football Business) is a higher education institution offering undergraduate and postgraduate university degrees and executive education in the football business, sport and events industries. UCFB is a college of the University of East London.

UCFB became the world's first higher education institution with university degrees in the football and sports industry when it was opened at Burnley F.C.'s Turf Moor in 2011.

Campus locations 

UCFB's first campus, UCFB Burnley, opened in 2011 at Burnley Football Club. The Queen and Prince Philip visited UCFB Burnley during their tour of Turf Moor and Burnley F.C. as part of the Jubilee Celebrations.

UCFB Wembley opened in 2014 at Wembley Stadium.

In 2016, opened a flagship campus based in and around the Etihad Stadium. UCFB Etihad Campus' facilities include access to sporting facilities such as the Manchester Regional Arena and the National Basketball Performance Centre. The Etihad Campus replaced UCFB Burnley.

Global Institute of Sport 
In July 2020, UCFB launched the Global Institute of Sport (GIS). GIS offers master’s degree programmes in the football and sports industry in the UK, US, Canada and Australia.

UCFB academies 
UCFB's elite football academies based at UCFB's campuses in Manchester and Wembley are tailored for elite-level footballers who have recently been released from professional football clubs, or for those that possess an ability to play at a higher level.

The academies allow students to combine working within a professional football environment, led by UEFA qualified coaches, with a place on one of UCFB and GIS' unique degrees in football or sport.

UCFB Academy, Manchester is available to male students and is based at UCFB Etihad Campus, whilst UCFB Academy, Wembley is located at UCFB Wembley Campus.

Programmes 

The UCFB's Employability & Enrichment programme includes its Executive Guest Speaker Series and work experience opportunities.

The UCFB Strategic Leadership & Management Programme, another aspect of the Employment & Enrichment programme, is led by Neil Doncaster, Chief Executive of the Scottish Professional Football League.

UCFB students also have the opportunity to work towards a number of internal and external additional qualifications relevant to the industry. These include FA Coaching certificates, STATS (formerly Prozone Performance Analysis) and foreign language qualifications.

References

Other references 
 
 

Universities and colleges in the United Kingdom
2011 establishments in England
Educational institutions established in 2011
Education in Burnley
Burnley F.C.
Higher education colleges in London
Wembley Stadium
Education in Manchester
Manchester City F.C.